Raihan Hasan is a Bangladeshi international footballer who plays as a defender. He currently plays for and captains Sheikh Jamal DC. Raihan is known for releasing long throw-ins into the opponent's danger zone, he carries on the tradition set by many Bangladeshi full-backs in the past.

Club career

Sheikh Jamal DC
Raihan started his career with Dhanmondi giant Sheikh Jamal DC. After finishing as runners up in the league in 2012, during his debut season, Raihan helped the club win both Bangladesh Premier League and Federation Cup titles in the following year. he won the double once again in 2014.

Abahani Limited Dhaka
On 1 January 2017, Raihan Joined Bangladeshi giants Dhaka Abahani. During his four year spell at the club Raihan won the Bangladesh Premier League title in his debut season, and also won the Federation Cup trophy on two occasions. He was also part of the Abahani team that reached the knockout phase of the 2019 AFC Cup. During his last season at the club, Raihan registered 6 assists, all through his long throw-ins.

Return to Sheikh Jamal DC
On 21 October 2021, Raihan returned to Sheikh Jamal Dhanmondi Club, after spending the last four seasons with Abahani.  Upon returning to the club, coach Juan Manuel Martínez Sáez converted Raihan into a centre back.

International career

Youth
Raihan has represented Bangladesh by playing for the Bangladesh U-23 team. On 15th September 2014, he made his international debut for Bangladesh U-23 team in the match against Afghanistan U-23 team in 2014 Asian Games. He scored his first goal for the U-23 side against Nepal U23 during the 2016 South Asian Games.

Senior
On March 7, 2013, at the age of 18, Raihan made his international debut for Bangladesh during a friendly match against the Northern Mariana Islands . In the 85th minute of the match , he entered the field as a substitute for the attacking player Mithun Chowdhury. Bangladesh won the match 4–0.

International goals

Olympic Team

References 

1987 births
Living people
Bangladeshi footballers
Bangladesh international footballers
Bangladesh Football Premier League players
Sheikh Jamal Dhanmondi Club players
Abahani Limited (Dhaka) players
Association football defenders
Footballers at the 2014 Asian Games
Asian Games competitors for Bangladesh
South Asian Games bronze medalists for Bangladesh
South Asian Games medalists in football